Catharina Elizabeth "Kitty" ter Braake (19 December 1913 – 20 June 1991) was a Dutch sprinter. She competed in the women's 4 × 100 metres relay at the 1936 Summer Olympics.

References

External links
 

1913 births
1991 deaths
Athletes (track and field) at the 1936 Summer Olympics
Dutch female sprinters
Dutch female hurdlers
Olympic athletes of the Netherlands
Place of birth missing